This is a list of all extant genera, species and subspecies of the snakes of the subfamily Boinae, otherwise referred to as boines or true boas. It follows the taxonomy currently provided by ITIS, which is based on the continuing work of Roy McDiarmid.

 Boa, true boas sensu stricto
 Boa constrictor, boa constrictor or red-tailed boa
 Boa constrictor constrictor, red-tailed boa constrictor
 Boa constrictor longicauda, long-tailed boa constrictor
 Boa constrictor occidentalis, Argentine boa constrictor (also known locally as ampalagua, lampalagua or boa de las vizcacheras) 
 Boa constrictor ortonii, Orton's boa constrictor
 Boa imperator, Central American boa, northern boa or Colombian boa
 Boa imperator imperator, Central American boa, northern boa or Colombian boa
 Boa imperator sabogae, Pearl Islands boa
 Boa nebulosa, Dominican boa constrictor
 Boa orophias, Saint Lucia boa
 Boa sigma, Mexican west coast boa constrictor
 Chilabothrus, West Indian boas or Greater Antillean boas
 Chilabothrus ampelophis
 Chilabothrus angulifer, Cuban boa or Cuban tree boa
Chilabothrus argentum, Conception Bank silver boa, Conception Bank boa or silver boa
 Chilabothrus chrysogaster, Turks and Caicos Islands boa or Southern Bahamas boa
 Chilabothrus chrysogaster chrysogaster, Turks and Caicos Islands boa
 Chliabothrus chrysogaster relicquus, Great Inagua boa
 Chilabothrus exsul, Abaco Islands boa or Northern Bahamas boa
 Chilabothrus fordii, Ford's boa or Hispaniolan desert boa
 Chilabothrus fordii agametus, Môle Saint Nicholas boa
 Chilabothrus fordii fordii, Ford's boa or Hispaniolan desert boa
 Chilabothrus fordii manototus, Île à Caprit boa
 Chilabothrus gracilis, Hispaniolan vine boa
 Chilabothrus gracilis gracilis,  Dominican Republic vine boa
 Chilabothrus gracilis hapalus, Tiburon Peninsula vine boa
 Chilabothrus granti, Virgin Islands boa
 Chilabothrus inornatus, Puerto Rican boa
 Chilabothrus monensis, Mona Island boa
 Chilabothrus schwartzi, Crooked-Acklins boa
 Chilabothrus striatus, Hispaniolan boa or Haitian boa
 Chilabothrus striatus exagistus, Tiburon Peninsula boa
 Chilabothrus striatus striatus, Hispaniolan red mountain boa or Dominican red mountain boa
 Chilabothrus striatus warreni, Île de la Tortue boa
 Chilabothrus strigilatus, Bahamian boa
 Chilabothrus strigilatus ailurus, Cat Island boa
 Chilabothrus strigilatus fosteri, Bimini boa
 Chilabothrus strigilatus fowleri, Andros boa
 Chilabothrus strigilatus mccraniei, Ragged Island boa
 Chilabothrus strigilatus strigilatus, Bahamian boa
 Chilabothrus subflavus, Jamaican boa, Jamaican yellow boa or yellow snake
 Corallus, neotropical tree boas
 Corallus annulatus, annulated tree boa or ringed tree boa
 Corallus annulatus annulatus, northern annulated tree boa or northern ringed tree boa
 Corallus annulatus colombianus, Colombian annulated tree boa or Colombian ringed tree boa
 Corallus batesii, Amazon Basin emerald tree boa
 Corallus blombergi, Ecuadorian annulated tree boa or Blomberg's tree boa
 Corallus caninus, emerald tree boa
 Corallus cookii, Cook's tree boa
 Corallus cropanii, Cropani's tree boa
 Corallus grenadensis, Grenada tree boa or Grenada Bank tree boa
 Corallus hortulanus, Amazon tree boa, garden tree boa or macabrel
 Corallus ruschenbergerii, Central American tree boa or Trinidad tree boa
 Epicrates, rainbow boas
 Epicrates alvarezi, Argentinian rainbow boa
 Epicrates assisi, Caatinga rainbow boa
 Epicrates cenchria, rainbow boa
 Epicrates cenchria barbouri, Marajo Island rainbow boa
 Epicrates cenchria cenchria, Brazilian rainbow boa
 Epicrates cenchria gaigei, Peruvian rainbow boa
 Epicrates cenchria hygrophilus, Espirito Santo rainbow boa
 Epicrates cenchria polylepis, Central Highlands rainbow boa
 Epicrates crassus, Paraguayan rainbow boa
 Epicrates maurus, brown rainbow boa
 Eunectes, anacondas
 Eunectes beniensis, Bolivian anaconda or Beni anaconda
 Eunectes deschauenseei, dark-spotted anaconda or De Schauensee's anaconda
 Eunectes murinus, green anaconda
 Eunectes notaeus, yellow anaconda

See also
 List of erycine species and subspecies

References

 
Boinae
Boinae